George William Daley (September 14, 1875 - August 12, 1952) was an American newspaper editor, sports writer, and syndicated author of fictional baseball stories and poetry The Stolen Base. He often used the pseudonym Monitor. Daley was born in Clinton Heights, Rensselaer County, New York and married Marion Rhines while a student at Union College in Schenectady, New York.

They had a daughter, Marjorie May, and settled in West Brighton, New York. It is there that he launched his newspaper career, initially at the Staten Islander and as the Staten Island correspondent for the New York World, 1895–1899, and later, the Brooklyn Eagle and the New York Sun. From 1900-1905 he created the popular Home Run Haggerty and Strike Out Sawyer fictional characters and launched his syndicated baseball stories.

Mr. Daley joined the New York Herald as a telegraph editor in 1905 and quickly worked his way up the ladder to night city editor, night editor, news editor and, ultimately, managing editor.

His failing health prompted his doctor to recommend a career change and so he rejoined the staff of the New York World as a sports writer where he chronicled the play-by-play and results of sporting contests from golf, cycling, collegiate football, yachting, tennis, boxing, horse-racing to, his favorite, baseball.

While at the World, his Monitor by-line headed regular weekly columns including Over the Plate and Sport Talk and he became a recognized authority on baseball, heading the New York Chapter of the Baseball Writers Association .

When the World closed its doors in 1931, Mr. Daley went to work for The New York Times as a copy editor in the sports department until his death in 1952.

1875 births
1952 deaths
American newspaper editors